Immoral Tales: European Sex & Horror Movies 1956–1984 is the title of a 1994 non fiction book by Cathal Tohill and Pete Tombs, that won the Bram Stoker Award for Best Non-Fiction. The book covers European exploitation cinema with profiles of Jesús Franco, José Larraz, Alain Robbe-Grillet, Jean Rollin, Walerian Borowczyk and Jose Bénazéraf. It is notable for being one of the few books to concentrate solely on the sex/horror subgenre of cinema and is currently out of print.

Reviews
"The book affords a comprehensive, fascinating, and even loving look at the sleazy, gory, sexy, blasphemous underside of European cinema" (Mike Tribby in Booklist)

Editions
Immoral Tales: Sex and Horror Cinema in Europe, 1956–1984 published by Primitive Press in 1994 
Immoral Tales: Sex and Horror Cinema in Europe, 1956–1984 published by Titan Books in 1995 
Immoral tales: European Sex & Horror Movies 1956–1984 U.S. edition, published by St. Martin's Griffin in September 1995 

1994 non-fiction books
Books about film
Books about Europe